Pissodes striatulus, the balsam bark weevil, is a species of true weevil in the beetle family Curculionidae. It is found in North America.

References

Further reading

 
 

Molytinae
Articles created by Qbugbot
Beetles described in 1775
Taxa named by Johan Christian Fabricius